Thomas Legh may refer to:

 Sir Thomas Legh (lawyer) (c. 1510–1545), English ambassador to Denmark and a jurist involved in Henry VIII's Dissolution of the Monasteries
 Thomas Legh (1593–1644), of Adlington, High Sheriff of Cheshire 1629 and 1643
 Thomas Legh (1614–1687), of Adlington, High Sheriff of Cheshire 1662
 Thomas Legh (1644–1691), of Adlington, High Sheriff of Cheshire 1688
 Thomas Legh (1636–1697), MP for Liverpool, 1685–1689
 Thomas Legh (1675–1717), MP for Newton, 1701–1713
 Thomas Peter Legh (1754–1797), MP for Newton, 1780–1797
 Thomas Legh (died 1857) (1793–1857), MP for Newton, 1814–1832
 Thomas Legh, 2nd Baron Newton (1857–1942), MP for Newton 1886–1898, Paymaster-General 1915–1916

See also
 Thomas Legh Claughton (1808–1892), British academic, poet and clergyman
Thomas Leigh (disambiguation)